Lawrence & Foulks was a 19th-century American shipbuilding company based in New York. Established in the early 1850s, the company built 144 vessels of all types over the course of some fifty years, but is best known for its production of high-speed wooden-hulled steamboats and steamships. In addition to the domestic market, the company also built ships for service as far afield as South America and China.

Lawrence & Foulks was one of the few New York shipyards to survive the post-Civil War slump, but was either unwilling or unable to make the postwar transition from wooden to iron shipbuilding, and closed its doors around the turn of the century.

History

Origins, 1850–54

In 1849, William Foulks, a British-born ship's carpenter then aged 37, partnered with a young engineer named Humphrey Crary to build a steamboat in New York, which was named Catherine after Foulks' wife. Foulks received contracts to build several more vessels over the next two years. At this time, his shipyard was located at the foot of Cherry Street, Manhattan.

By 1852, Foulks had established a partnership with Herbert Lawrence, and the company was renamed Lawrence & Foulks. Lawrence, then barely in his twenties, was the son of Herbert Lawrence Sr., former co-proprietor of the prominent early New York shipbuilding firm of Lawrence & Sneden.  By 1854, the Lawrence & Foulks shipyard had relocated to North Fifth Street, Williamsburg (now a part of Brooklyn), where it would remain for the next 17 years.

Plant, equipment and labor force

While the specific plant and equipment utilized by Lawrence & Foulks is not known, wooden shipbuilding firms in this era could be established for a remarkably small outlay—as little as $11,000, and rarely more than $20,000. Tradesmen at this time mostly supplied their own tools, so a shipyard needed little more than a waterfront property large enough to hold a timber yard and a slipway or two, a derrick to lift heavy components, a large crosscut saw and a few other tools.

Since New York was already well served by a number of existing marine engine plants, Lawrence & Foulks, like the other New York shipyards, had no need to establish an expensive engine plant of its own, but could rely upon outsourcing for its steamship engines. Companies which would build marine engines for Lawrence & Foulks prior to the Civil War included leading firms such as the Allaire Iron Works, Morgan Iron Works, Henry Esler & Co. and the Novelty Iron Works. After the war, when many of New York's marine engine manufacturers went out of business, Lawrence & Foulks appears to have come increasingly to rely upon New Jersey's Fletcher, Harrison & Co. to meet its machinery requirements.

As with other shipbuilders of the era, the size of Lawrence & Foulks' workforce could fluctuate greatly depending upon the available work. The company appears to have employed about 50 people for every ship under construction, and it was capable of building as many as four ships at once.

Early years, 1850s–1860
 
Through the 1850s, Lawrence & Foulks built a number of steamers and other vessels for South American clients, including the 300-ton Spanish steamers General Concha and General Serrano for Cuban service; a large steamer for the Río de la Plata; and two small high-pressure riverboats for the Peruvian government destined for service on the Amazon. Two 1,300-ton steamers for Californian service were also completed.

In 1855, Lawrence & Foulks completed construction of the Long Island Sound steamer Commonwealth. Setting a new standard of elegance for Sound steamers, this large, lavishly outfitted steamer quickly became a favorite with the travelling public. Both vessels were later purchased by the U.S. Navy and would serve with distinction during the Civil War as gunboats.

American Civil War, 1861–65

With the outbreak of the Civil War, the U.S. Navy quickly purchased or chartered hundreds of ships from private steamship companies, which were needed to establish the blockade of Confederate ports and to transport troops and supplies along the Atlantic coast. The steamship companies were then obliged to return to the shipyards to replace their fleets, only to find themselves vying with the Navy which needed still more ships. The strong demand for new shipping created boom conditions for American shipyards which would last to the end of the war. New York shipyards in this period also benefited from the Treaty of Tianjin. Ratified in 1860, the treaty gave U.S. companies increased access to Chinese waterways and ports, which in turn stimulated demand for steamboats and steamships for Chinese service.   
 
In 1861-62 Lawrence & Foulks completed at least three screw steamers for U.S. companies operating in China: Flambeau, Kiang-Tsze and Sze-Chuen. The latter two were duly despatched to China but Flambeau was purchased by the U.S. Navy to serve as the gunboat . The company also completed a number of screw steamers for domestic American service during the war, including , D. S. Miller and John L. Hasbrouck, all for Hudson River service. After a few months on the Hudson, Isaac Smith, like Flambeau, was requisitioned by the Navy for conversion into a gunboat. All the above-mentioned screw steamers were powered by beam-propeller engines—a transitional technology that mated the old, slow-rpm beam engine with the screw propeller by mounting the engine athwartships and gearing it up (at a ratio of one to three or more) to the propeller shaft.

Another newly built Lawrence & Foulks ship to be requisitioned by the Navy at this time was the small sidewheel steamer . In an attack on Mathias Point, Virginia on 27 June 1861, Thomas Freeborns commander, James H. Ward, became the first U.S. Navy officer killed in action in the war. 
 
In 1864, Lawrence & Foulks completed the Hudson River steamboat Chauncey Vibbard. Soon after entering service, the 280-foot vessel proved to be the fastest steamer on the highly competitive route from New York to Albany, making the trip in a new record time of 6 hours 42 minutes. With boilers carefully balanced to eliminate vibration, and a hull said to "cut the water as a knife blade", Chauncey Vibbard helped establish a reputation for Lawrence & Foulks as America's leading designers of high-speed watercraft.

Postwar slump, 1865–70

With the end of the war in April 1865, the U.S. shipbuilding industry experienced a severe downturn. The Navy dumped more than a million tons of unwanted shipping onto the market, depressing prices and leaving shipyards with no work. High postwar prices, along with a series of bitter (and unsuccessful) strikes for the eight-hour day, helped prolong the slump to the end of the decade. The slump had a devastating effect on the New York shipbuilding industry, with most of the city's shipbuilders and marine engine manufacturers going out of business in this period.

Lawrence & Foulks was one of only a handful of New York shipyards to survive the prolonged slump, aided in part by a flurry of orders in 1864-65. Livingston, Fox & Co., preparing to resume its prewar New York to New Orleans service, ordered a total of six sub-1000 ton steamers from Lawrence & Foulks in this period, including Herman Livingston, General J. K. Barnes and the four sister ships Albermarle, Hatteras, Raleigh and Rapidan. Two large 1,300 ton steamers, Vera Cruz and Manhattan, were also built in 1865 for Charles A. Whitney's American and Mexican Mail Steamship Company. In 1866, Lawrence & Foulks built the 2,200-ton steamship Oregonian for Californian service—probably the largest steamship ever built by the company.

By 1869 the slump had reached its nadir. Lawrence & Foulks managed to secure a couple of contracts early in the year, for the ferry Sylvan Glen and a small 100-ton steamer, but by September, only one vessel was under construction in the whole of New York.

Recovery, 1871–73
 
The long postwar slump finally ended in 1871, as shipowners began to return to U.S. shipyards to replace their ageing fleets. In April 1871, after almost twenty years at Williamsburg, Lawrence & Foulks relocated their shipyard to the foot of Noble Street, Greenpoint, on the site of E. S. Whitlock's former shipyard, who like many others had retired from the business after the war.

From 1871 to 1873, New York shipyards remained busy. By this time however, the larger steamship contracts were going to the builders of iron-hulled ships on the Delaware—to firms such as John Roach & Sons, William Cramp & Sons, and Harlan and Hollingsworth—leaving New York shipbuilders to fulfill contracts for smaller vessels such as ferries, commuter and excursion steamers, steam yachts and tugboats.

Lawrence & Foulks secured a substantial number of such contracts in this period. A notable example was Sylvan Dell, a ferry built for the Harlem & New York Navigation Company. With a speed in excess of 20 mph, Sylvan Dell was New York Harbor's fastest vessel in her class, and remained popular with the public for many years, eventually being dubbed "Queen of New York Harbor". In 1873, Lawrence & Foulks built Jennie Stout—the first schooner built in New York since the war, and the largest three-masted schooner built there to that date.

Decline and closure, 1873–1902

The brief early 1870s boom came to an abrupt end with the Panic of 1873. The subsequent recession would drag on until 1879, but by 1875 there was a widespread recognition that this time there would be no recovery for New York shipyards. Not only were the iron shipbuilders of the Delaware now dominating the contracts for larger ships, but the locus of wooden shipbuilding in the U.S. had moved to the state of Maine, where lower prices for timber, and lower wages, enabled the construction of wooden-hulled vessels as much as 20% cheaper than in New York.

The extent of New York's decline as a shipbuilding center from 1873 is well illustrated by the fortunes of Lawrence & Foulks itself. In the 24 years from 1851 to 1875, Lawrence & Foulks built a total of 122 vessels, an average of more than five per year. In the firm's remaining 25 years, from 1876 to 1901, it built only another 22 vessels, an average of less than one per year. Among the latter were San Rafael and Saucelito, sister ferries built in 1877 which were shipped overland in pieces to San Francisco. After reassembly, the two vessels quickly established themselves as the fastest ferries on the Bay.

Among the last notable steamers built by Lawrence & Foulks were Albertina, built in 1882 for the Red Bank Line, and the steam yacht Clermont for Commodore Alfred van Santvoord of the New York and Albany Line. In August 1886, William Foulks fell from scaffolding while inspecting a vessel at his shipyard, suffering internal injuries. He died at home, aged 74, a few days later. His partner, Herbert Lawrence, retired in about 1894, but maintained his office in Greenpoint until shortly before he died, aged 73, in 1902. In total, the Lawrence & Foulks shipyard built 144 vessels of all types in the fifty years to 1901.

List of ships

The first table below lists ships known to have been built by William Foulks, probably before his partnership with Herbert Lawrence. The second table lists ships built by Lawrence & Foulks. The two lists combined currently represent 112 of the 144 ships known to have been built by Foulks alone or by Lawrence & Foulks. In addition to the ships listed below, Lawrence & Foulks also designed the model for the Hudson River steamer Albany, but as she had an iron hull the construction contract went to Harlan and Hollingsworth.

Vessels which had more than one name during their career have their later names listed below the original name, followed (where available) by a two-digit number representing the last two digits of the year in which the rename took place. For other abbreviations, see the linked notes in the table column headers.

Footnotes

References

Bibliography
Books

 Adams, Arthur G. (1996): The Hudson Through the Years, Fordham University Press, p. 143, .
 Dayton, Fred Erving (1925): Steamboat Days, Frederick A. Stokes Company, New York. 
 Elleman, Bruce A. (2001): Modern Chinese Warfare, 1795-1989, p. 47, Routledge, . 
 Fairburn, William Armstrong; Ritchie, Ethel M. (1954–55): Merchant Sail, Volume 5, Center Lovell, Maine : Fairburn Marine Educational Foundation. 
 Frazer, John F. (1863): Journal of the Franklin Institute, Third Series, Volume XLV, January–June 1863, Franklin Institute, Philadelphia. 
  
 Griffiths & Bates (1855): The Monthly Nautical Magazine and Quarterly Review, Volume 2, April–September 1855, pp. 221–226, Griffiths & Bates, New York. 
 Heinrich, Thomas R. (1997): Ships for the Seven Seas: Philadelphia Shipbuilding in the Age of Industrial Capitalism, The Johns Hopkins University Press, . 
 Heyl, Erik (1953): Early American Steamers, Volume 1, Erik Heyl, Buffalo, New York. 
 Heyl, Erik (1965): Early American Steamers, Volume 4, Erik Heyl, Buffalo, New York. 
 Johnson, Emory R.; Huebner, Grover G. (1920): Principles of Ocean Transportation, p. 23, D. Appleton & Co., New York and London. 
 Matteson, George (2005): Tugboats of New York: An Illustrated History, pp. 54–55, NYU Press, . 
 Morrison, John Harrison (1903): History of American Steam Navigation, W. F. Sametz & Co., New York. 
 Morrison, John Harrison (1909): History of New York Shipyards, W. F. Sametz & Co., New York. 
 Peabody Essex Museum (1956): The American Neptune, Volume 16, Peabody Essex Museum.
 Ridgely-Nevitt, Cedric (1981): American Steamships on the Atlantic, pp. 348–349, University of Delaware Press, Newark. 
 Swede, George (2010): The Steam Tug, pp. 110, 160, Xlibris Books, United States, . 
Periodicals
 Silka, Henry: "Shipbuilding and the Nascent Community of Greenpoint, New York, 1850-1855", Northern Mariner, Volume 16.
 The Brooklyn Daily Eagle 
 The New York Times

Companies established in 1852
Defunct shipbuilding companies of the United States
1852 establishments in New York (state)
American shipbuilders
Ships built by Lawrence & Foulks